Allium saxatile is a Eurasian species of onion native to European Russia, Belarus, Caucasus, and the Altai Krai region in Siberia. The species was formerly perceived as including additional populations from central and eastern Asia  but recent studies have resulting in splitting of the old species into several distinct species.

References

saxatile
Onions
Flora of Eastern Europe
Flora of temperate Asia
Plants described in 1798